Bernard Nowicki is bishop of the Central Diocese of the Polish National Catholic Church. An alumnus of the University of Pittsburgh, he was consecrated on September 14, 2012 in succession to Bishop John Mack.

External links 
PNCC Central Diocese
Online biography

Living people
American bishops
American Polish National Catholics
Bishops of the Polish National Catholic Church
American people of Polish descent
People from Buffalo, New York
University of Pittsburgh alumni
Year of birth missing (living people)